Ashkhaneh (also Romanized as Āshkhāneh) is a city and capital of Maneh and Samalqan County in North Khorasan Province, Iran. At the 2006 census, its population was 18,234, in 4,642 families.

The majority of the population is Kurdish.

Geography 
Based on geographical studies and the third period of geology, Samolghan is located on a gentle plain and the city of Ashkhaneh is the first entry city of North Khorasan province from the northern provinces of Iran. The city is divided into two parts by the construction of a bridge and is located on the side of the Asian road, which is about 120 km through this transit road through the city of Maneh and Samolghan. The city has a Mediterranean climate with cold winters and hot summers. The area of Ashkhaneh city is 339 hectares.

References 

Populated places in Maneh and Samalqan County

Cities in North Khorasan Province

Kurdish settlements in Iran